48 Hours of Hallucinatory Sex   (original title: 48 Horas de Sexo Alucinante) is a 1987 Brazilian trash/sexploitation film by Brazilian film director José Mojica Marins. Marins is also known by his alter ego Zé do Caixão (in English, Coffin Joe). The film is the third of several sexploitation films Marins released in the 1980s. It was preceded by World Market of Sex (1979) and 24 Hours of Explicit Sex (1985).

Plot
In the film (as well as its two predecessors), Marins exploited Brazil's then loosening restrictions on nudity in film in order to produce an alternate sort of pornography which presents physical sexuality with bizarre and often repulsive imagery, generally depicting characters which are carrying out some type of test, contest, or experiment.

The plot of the film centers on a female sexologist who wishes to finance and produce a pornographic film. As the film progresses it is revealed that the doctor may have an ulterior goal in coaxing her actors into their drugged and sexually frenzied states. Ultimately the doctor persuades a man to dress in an ox costume and penetrate her vaginally while she is naked inside a wooden cow.

Cast
Oswaldo Cirilo
Walter Gabarron
Zé da Ilha
Sílvio Junior
Mário Lima
Nelson Carlos Magalhães
José Mojica Marins
Benê de Oliveira
Andrea Pucci
Nádia Tell

References

External links 
 Official film site 

48 Horas de Sexo Alucinante on Portal Heco de Cinema 

1987 films
Brazilian erotic films
1980s Portuguese-language films
Films directed by José Mojica Marins
Brazilian sequel films